Evan McEneny (born May 22, 1994) is a Canadian professional ice hockey defenceman who is currently an unrestricted free agent. He most recently played for the Laval Rocket in the American Hockey League (AHL). Undrafted, he formerly played with the Vancouver Canucks of the National Hockey League (NHL).

Playing career
McEneny went undrafted in the 2012 NHL Entry Draft after playing only two games for the Kitchener Rangers of the Ontario Hockey League due to a torn ACL suffered in the second game of the season which caused him to miss the remaining games. He later signed with the Vancouver Canucks on September 13, 2012, as an undrafted free agent. On November 20, 2013, McEneny was traded by the Rangers to the Kingston Frontenacs.

McEneny spent most of the 2015–16 season, his first professional season, playing with the Kalamazoo Wings of the ECHL. The following season, he was assigned to start the season with the Utica Comets of the AHL. On February 24, 2017, McEneny was recalled to the NHL for the first time by the Canucks. He made his NHL debut the following night against the San Jose Sharks as the Canucks were defeated 4–1.

As an unsigned free agent from the Canucks, McEneny sat out the opening months of the 2019–20 season recovering from a knee injury. On completing rehabilitation, McEneny signed a professional tryout with the Laval Rocket of the AHL, affiliate to the Montreal Canadiens, on November 21, 2019.

Career statistics

See also
List of players who played only one game in the NHL

References

External links 

1994 births
Living people
Canadian ice hockey defencemen
Ice hockey people from Ontario
Kitchener Rangers players
Kingston Frontenacs players
Kalamazoo Wings (ECHL) players
Laval Rocket players
Sportspeople from Hamilton, Ontario
Undrafted National Hockey League players
Utica Comets players
Vancouver Canucks players